Cruoriella is a genus of red algae in the family Peyssonneliaceae.

 Namesbrought to synonymy
 Cruoriella armorica P.Crouan & H.Crouan (type), a synonym for Peyssonnelia armorica (P.Crouan & H.Crouan) Weber-van Bosse, 1916

References

External links

 
 Cruoriella at AlgaeBase

Red algae genera
Peyssonneliales